Guadalupito District is one of three districts of the province Virú in Peru.

References